Aberdeen F.C. competed in the Scottish Football League Division One and the Scottish Cup in season 1908–09.

Overview

This was Aberdeen's sixth season overall and fourth in the top flight. Aberdeen finished in eighth place in Division One and scored a club record 61 goals in 34 league games. In the Scottish Cup, they were knocked out in the second round by Third Lanark. Willie Lennie finished as top scorer with 14 goals in both competitions.

Results

Scottish Division One

Final standings

Scottish Cup

Squad

Appearances and goals

|}

References

Notes

Aberdeen F.C. seasons
Aberdeen